The Lancair Propjet is a four-seat, pressurized, composite aircraft powered by a 750-hp Walter M601E turboprop engine. The aircraft is based on Lancair's successful kit-plane, the Lancair IV. Like its piston-powered predecessor, the Propjet is noted for its performance, with a typical cruise speed of 325 knots at 24,000 feet and a climb performance of 4,000 feet per minute.

Production of the aircraft kit was ended in 2012.

Specifications

References

External links

 Information on the Propjet from Lancair

2000s United States civil utility aircraft
Propjet
Homebuilt aircraft
Single-engined tractor aircraft
Single-engined turboprop aircraft
Low-wing aircraft